A safe seat is an electoral district (constituency) in a legislative body (e.g. Congress, Parliament, City Council) which is regarded as fully secure, for either a certain political party, or the incumbent representative personally or a combination of both. In such seats, there is very little chance of a seat changing hands because of the political leanings of the electorate in the constituency concerned and/or the popularity of the incumbent member. The opposite (i.e. more competitive) type of seat is a marginal seat. The phrase tantamount to election is often used to describe winning the dominant party's nomination for a safe seat.

Definition

There is a spectrum between safe and marginal seats. Safe seats can still change hands in a landslide election, such as Enfield Southgate being lost by the Conservatives (and potential future party leader Michael Portillo) to Labour at the 1997 UK general election, whilst other seats may remain marginal despite large national swings, such as Gedling, which Labour narrowly won in every election for twenty years until the 2019 general election, despite having both major victories and defeats during this time. Gedling would still be seen as a marginal seat, even though it had been held by Labour for a long time. Safe seats are usually seats that have been held by one party for a long time, but the two concepts are not interchangeable.

In countries with parliamentary government, parties often try to ensure that their most talented or influential politicians are selected to contest these seats – in part to ensure that these politicians can stay in parliament, regardless of the specific election result, and that they can concentrate on ministerial roles without needing to spend too much effort on managing electorate-specific issues.

Candidate selection for a party's safe seats is usually keenly contested, although many parties restrict or forbid challenges to the nomination of sitting members. The selection process can see the incumbent party, untroubled by the need to have a representative that must appeal to a broader electorate, take the opportunity to choose a candidate from the more ideological reaches of the membership. Opposing parties will often be compelled to nominate much less well-known individuals (such as backroom workers or youth activists in the party), who will sometimes do little more than serve as paper candidates who do little or no campaigning, or will use the contest to gain experience so that they become more likely to be selected for a more winnable seat. In some cases (especially in the United States), these seats may go uncontested by other major parties.

Safe seats can become marginal seats (and vice versa) gradually as voter allegiances shift over time. However, this shift can happen more rapidly for a variety of reasons. The retirement or death of a popular sitting member may make a seat more competitive, as the accrued personal vote of a long-serving parliamentarian will sometimes have resisted countervailing demographic trends. An independent or third party candidate with an ideology close to that of the incumbent party may also be able to make a more credible challenge than more established parties, but these factors can combine: a retiring third-party member may turn a safe seat for that party into a marginal seat. For instance, in Berwick-upon-Tweed, with the retirement of the popular incumbent Alan Beith, the seat was no longer safe for the Liberal Democrats.

Traditionally safe seats can also be more vulnerable in by-elections, especially for governing parties. Safe seats may also become marginal if the sitting member is involved in scandal: in 1997, Tatton was gained from the Conservatives by an anti-sleaze independent candidate, despite the majority previously being that of a very safe seat for the Conservatives. The incumbent, Neil Hamilton, had been mired in controversy, and was defeated by the veteran BBC journalist Martin Bell. However, Bell was aided by the decision of the main opposition parties (Labour and the Liberal Democrats) not to field candidates. Without such pacts, a split vote is more likely under a first past the post electoral system, as in the UK.

Opposition supporters in safe seats have restricted means to affect election outcomes, and thus the incumbent parties can, in theory, decide to ignore those supporters' concerns, as they have no direct effect on the election result. Even those voters who are moderate supporters of the incumbent party may be disenfranchised by having a representative whose views may be more extreme than their own. Political objectors in such areas may experience marginalisation from wider democratic processes and political apathy. This is often regarded as undemocratic, and is a major argument in favour of various multi-member proportional representation election methods. Safe seats may receive far less political funding than marginal seats, as the parties will attempt to "buy" marginal seats with funding (a process known in North America and Australia as "pork barrelling"), while ignoring safe seats which will reliably fall to the same party every time; this is especially true in cases where the safe seat is held by the minority party.

In countries that do not apply the first past the post system, many of which equally operate a geographic division-based system, selected or party sub-nominated candidates can be allocated a safer or more tenuous list position. If a party is strong enough nationwide to gather representations in all subdivisions, the top candidate(s) on each list tend to be very safely elected to parliament. This is seen in the extremely proportional election systems of the Nordic countries, for example. Safe seats and candidates can be avoided altogether by a purposefully marginal-preference allocation of all divisions, ensuring all divisions are near-identically demographically diverse which may be achieved by pairing non-adjoining areas.

Australia
The Australian Electoral Commission defines seat margins as follows:

In his election analysis, psephologist Antony Green puts the cutoff between "safe" and "very safe" at 12%.

In Australia's federal system, most rural seats are safe seats for either the National Party or Liberal Party. Conversely, inner-city and poorer suburban seats are typically safe Australian Labor Party seats, and a few of the most affluent inner-middle urban seats are held by the Liberal Party. Marginals are generally concentrated in the middle-class outer-suburban areas of Australia's larger state capitals, which therefore decide most Australian federal elections.

At the 2007 federal election, the governing Australian Labor Party's safest seat was the seat of Division of Batman in Melbourne's inner-northern suburbs, with a two-party-preferred margin of 26.0%. The safest seat for the opposition Liberal Party was the rural Victorian electorate of Murray, with a margin of 18.3%. The Liberal Party's junior coalition partner, the National Party's safest seat was the division of Mallee, also located in rural Victoria, with a margin of 21.3%.

Canada
Examples include:

Beauséjour, a riding in southeastern New Brunswick, which is considered a safe seat for the Liberal Party. In 1990, when Jean Chrétien needed an open seat to become Leader of the Opposition, he chose Beauséjour in a by-election and won.
Bow River, located in southern Alberta, is considered a safe seat for the Conservatives. In the 2015 federal election, the Conservative candidate won by 77% of the vote.
Central Nova, located in east-central Nova Scotia, which has previously been called a safe seat for the Conservative Party and its predecessor, the Progressive Conservative Party, having been held by either Elmer MacKay or his son Peter for all but five of forty years until 2015. The only time the riding was not in Conservative control was from 1993 to 1997, when the Progressive Conservatives were reduced to just two seats nationwide and a socially conservative candidate ran for the Liberals. In 1983, when Brian Mulroney became Progressive Conservative leader and needed a seat in the House of Commons, he chose to run in Central Nova. Liberal MP Sean Fraser won the seat in 2015,  and was re-elected in 2019 and 2021.
Crowfoot, a Conservative stronghold located in southern Alberta, which has been called the safest seat in the entire country. In the 2008 election, Conservative candidate Kevin Sorenson won 82.04% of the vote, and in a ranking measuring the electoral competitiveness of ridings by National Post reporter Dan Arnold, the district came in last in all of Canada, having an average margin of victory of 74%.
Battle River—Crowfoot, the successor to Crowfoot, is a solid Conservative stronghold and is considered one of the most solid seats in Canada. In the 2015 federal election, the Conservative candidate won by 80.91% of the vote.
Mount Royal, a Liberal stronghold in Montreal, Quebec, held by a succession of Liberal MPs since 1940. Liberal Irwin Cotler won over 75% of the vote in the 2004 federal election.
Ottawa—Vanier, a Liberal stronghold in the eastern part of Ottawa. It has elected a Liberal Member of Parliament each federal election since its creation in 1935, often in landslide victories. In fact, the previous electoral district which comprises most of the constituency, Russell, had been solidly Liberal since 1887.
Portage—Lisgar,  one of many rural, southern safe seats in the Prairies for the Conservative Party of Canada.
Saint-Laurent—Cartierville, yet another Liberal safe seat in Montreal. It has been held by the Liberals since its creation. In the 2004 federal election, incumbent Stéphane Dion won with over 65% of the vote, and over 21,000 votes more than his closest rival.
Wild Rose, a Conservative stronghold, also in southern Alberta. The incumbent, Blake Richards, won 72.9% of the vote in the 2008 election in what ranked as the largest majority win in the history of the constituency. Richards' predecessor, Myron Thompson, won 72% compared to 10% for his closest rival in the 2006 federal election.
York Centre, a safe seat for the Liberals in Toronto. Since the district's re-establishment in 1952, it has been out of Liberal hands only twice.
The City of Toronto, which holds 25 ridings is often considered a Liberal stronghold, having shut out the Conservative Party from the city in the six elections between 1993 and 2008, and having lost at most two ridings in the 2004, 2006 and 2008 elections to the New Democratic Party. The 2011 Canadian Federal Election ended the Liberal fortress of Toronto when both Conservatives and New Democrats elected many new MPs in Toronto. The former Liberal strength was restored in 2015 as they won all 25 Toronto ridings. However the city is not as safe at the Provincial level; for instance, the Liberal Party of Ontario won only 3 of Toronto's 41 ridings in the 2018 Provincial Election.
Fundy Royal, a riding in Southern New Brunswick, is usually a safe seat for Conservatives. It has only been held by two Liberal MPs since its founding in 1914, its first having held one term from 1993 to 1997 and the latest having been elected in 2015.
Southern Calgary, particularly Calgary Shepard, Calgary Heritage and Calgary Midnapore, is considered to be a solid Conservative stronghold. In the April 3, 2017 by-elections, the Conservative candidate for Midnapore won by 77% of the vote and the Conservative candidate for Heritage won by 71% of the vote. In the 2015 federal election, the Conservative candidate for Shepard won by 65% of the vote.
Sturgeon River—Parkland, located in Alberta near Edmonton, is considered a Conservative stronghold. In the October 23, 2017 by-election, the Conservative candidate won by 77% of the vote.
Battlefords—Lloydminster, located in Eastern Saskatchewan, is considered a Conservative stronghold, despite its low population. In the December 11, 2017 by-election, the Conservative candidate won by 69% of the vote.

Fiji

In Fiji, prior to the December 2006 military coup, elections were held under the 1997 Constitution, which allotted 46 of the House of Representatives' 71 seats on an ethnic basis. 23 were reserved for the indigenous majority, 19 for Indo-Fijians, 1 for Rotumans, and 3 for members of all other ethnic minorities. There was a strong tendency towards voting on ethnic lines. Thus, in the 1999 general election, although the indigenous seats were split between several parties, all 19 Indo-Fijian seats were won by the Fiji Labour Party – which won none of the indigenous seats. In the 2001 general election, the conservative indigenous nationalist Soqosoqo Duavata ni Lewenivanua party won 18 of the indigenous seats, with the other 5 going to the ultra-nationalist Conservative Alliance – which later merged into the SDL. All 19 "Indian" seats were retained by the Labour Party. In the 2006 general election, all Indo-Fijian seats remained safely Labour, while the SDL won all 23 indigenous seats. Among other minorities, only the communal seat of West Central was a safe seat for the ethnic United Peoples Party.

The new Constitution adopted in 2013 abolished constituency representation altogether, in favour of party list seat allocation based on nationwide results. The 2014 general election was held on that basis, thus putting an end to all safe seats. The Labour Party suffered a near wipe-out.

Hong Kong 

There is no formal definition in Hong Kong, yet there are some functional constituency seats which are regarded as fully secured by a political party or a political camp.

Fully secured by the pan-democracy camp:
Education, formerly called Teaching in the colonial period, has been a safe seat of HKPTU since 1985 until now. Except the incumbent Ip Kin-yuen, the LEGCO member elected in this constituency are members of the Democratic Party Hong Kong.
Legal has been a safe seat of Pro-democracy camp since 1985, and a safe seat for Civic Party since 2008. Ip Sik On, who was elected by this constituency in 1991, is the only one who is not from the pro-democracy camp.

Fully secured by the pro-Beijing camp:
Agriculture and Fisheries, which has been held by the Democratic Alliance for the Betterment and Progress of Hong Kong since its creation in 1998, with the DAB candidate being unopposed from 2000 to 2008.

New Zealand

In New Zealand, many rural electorates, and those based in wealthy suburban areas, notably the North Shore and eastern suburbs of Auckland, are considered safe seats for the National Party. An example of a safe National seat is Taranaki-King Country, currently held by Barbara Kuriger, who gained 68% of votes in the 2005 election, with only 16% of votes going to her Labour rival. By contrast, inner-city and poorer suburban electorates are safe Labour seats. For example, in 2020, the seat of Māngere was won by incumbent Labour MP William Sio with just under 74% of the vote, while his National rival won just under 12% of the vote.

Historically, some seats thought to be safe have witnessed surprise upsets. Perhaps the most dramatic recent case was the 1996 election, in which the Maori seats, safe Labour seats for the previous 60 years, were all won by New Zealand First.

The adoption of proportional representation by New Zealand, beginning in 1996, has decreased the importance of winning votes in geographical electorates. It remains to be seen what long-term effect proportional representation will have on the safety of individual electorate seats.

Philippines 
While party-switching in the Philippines is rampant, certain congressional districts have been held by political families for generations. These are:

 Camarines Sur–4th: A Fuentebella has served in Congress since 1925. The Fuentebellas have held this district since its creation in 2010, held the 3rd district from 1992 to 2010, and the 2nd district from 1925 to 1972, except from 1931 to 1935, and from 1946 to 1953. A Fuentebella represented Bicol from 1978 to 1984.
 Cebu–5th: A Durano had held this seat until 2019 when they were defeated. Prior to redistricting, the Duranos held Cebu–1st since 1949. The Duranos have also held the mayorship of Danao, the largest city in the district, for generations.
 Isabela–1st: An Albano has held this seat since 1987. Prior to redistricting, an Albano has represented Isabela's at-large district or the Cagayan Valley from 1957 to 1986, except from 1965 to 1969.
 La Union–1st: An Ortega has held this seat since 1945 except for two instances, and continually since 1969.
 Tarlac–1st: A Cojuangco has held this seat from 1907 to 1909, from 1934 to 1946, and continually since 1961.

Under the usual definition, Capiz–1st has been held by the Liberal Party since 1946, except from 1953 to 1957. Bohol's 3rd district has been held by the Nacionalista Party from 1946 to 1972.

South Korea 
From 1960s, Parliamentary Constituencies in Gyeongsang region especially Northern Gyeongbuk and Western Gyeongnam are considered as safe seats for People Power Party.

City centres of Busan and Southeastern Gyeongnam, Daegu and Southern Gyeogbuk and Parliamentary constituencies in rural Gangwon, Chungbuk, Chungnam and Gyeonggi and affluent villages such as Gangnam-gu, Seocho-gu, Songpa-gu and Yongsan-gu of Seoul and Bundang-gu of Seongnam are also considered as safe seats for People Power Party.

Parliamentary constituencies in Industrial areas and built up residential areas in Gyeonggi, Southeastern Gyeongnam, Cheongju - Daejeon - Sejong City and Jeonbuk and Jeonnam are considered as safe seats for Democratic Party.

United Kingdom 
On 6 April 2010, the Electoral Reform Society (ERS) estimated that going into the 2010 general election, of the 650 constituencies, 382 (59%) were safe seats. Some of these seats have since been lost by the parties that held them at the time, notably most of the Liberal Democrat seats and some Labour seats, meaning they can no longer be considered "safe".

Examples of safe seats for the Labour Party are in major urban areas and the industrial centres, such as the North West (Liverpool, Manchester); the North East (Newcastle, Sunderland); South and West Yorkshire, the Valleys of South Wales; the West Midlands county and parts of Inner London (e.g. Hackney and Newham).

Many areas of the Central Belt of Scotland, such as Glasgow and Edinburgh, were seen as safe Labour seats until the 2015 election, when the Scottish National Party took all but one Labour seat in Scotland (Edinburgh South).

Safe seats for the Conservative Party tend to be in rural areas: the Home Counties (e.g. Surrey, Buckinghamshire), the shires (e.g. North Yorkshire and Cheshire) and affluent areas of London (e.g. Chelsea and Fulham).

The safest seat in the 2017 general election was Liverpool Walton, where Labour received 86% of the vote, giving them a 77% majority over the second-placed Conservatives (at 9%). Christchurch is a safe Conservative seat; in 2017 the party gathered 69.6% of the vote there, giving it a near-50% majority over Labour. (The seat, however, did get taken by the Liberal Democrats in a by-election in 1993, but reverted to the Conservatives in the following general election.)

At the 2015 general election, seven out of eight of the Liberal Democrats' remaining seats were marginal, with their soon-to-be leader Tim Farron's seat of Westmorland and Lonsdale being the only one considered safe. Orkney and Shetland has been held by the Liberal Democrats and their predecessor party, the Liberal Party, continuously since the 1950 general election, but was almost lost to the Scottish National Party in the latter's national landslide. The seat of Sheffield Hallam was notable in the run up to the 2015 general election, when opinion polls were forecasting a Labour gain despite the incumbent MP, Nick Clegg, being the party leader and Deputy Prime Minister. The seat was, however, held by Clegg, albeit with a much reduced majority of just 2,353 (4.2%). In 2017, several Lib Dem MPs either regained their seat, such as Vince Cable and Ed Davey, or won new ones. Despite the net gain in seats, several were still lost, such as Clegg's, whilst Farron's majority was reduced to less than 1,000.

The ERS identifies what it calls "super safe seats", which have been held continuously by one party since the 19th century. In so doing, it equates seats with their rough equivalents under previous boundaries. For example, following the 2010 general election, it identifies the national representative of the area forming Haltemprice and Howden (drawn as a constituency in 1997) as having been a Conservative since the 1837 general election. Similarly, it considers that Wokingham (and a few others)  have been held by the Conservative Party since 1885, Devon East, Fylde and Arundel and South Downs since 1868, Hampshire North East since 1857, and Rutland and Melton, Bognor Regis and Littlehampton, and East Worthing and Shoreham all since 1841. (For historical reasons, the Conservative Party being older than the other current main parties, it holds all the oldest safe seats.)

Even the safest of seats can be – and sometimes are – upset. Whilst it is rare for the opposition to take such seats, outside candidates may be able to. Examples include the election of Peter Law and George Galloway in very safe Labour seats in 2005, Jim Murphy in the Eastwood constituency in Scotland in 1997, Martin Bell in the safe Conservative seat of Tatton in 1997, and most recently, Helen Morgan in the Conservatives' historically safest seat, North Shropshire, in a by-election in 2021.

The loss of safe seats can become historic moments: the defeat of Michael Portillo in his "safe" Conservative seat in 1997 created the "Portillo moment". That expression has since been used to describe huge voting swings that generally usher in a new government, as occurred in 1997. Similarly, in 2015, the Labour Party lost many formerly safe seats in Scotland, including Kirkcaldy and Cowdenbeath, which had previously been held by former Prime Minister Gordon Brown, and Paisley and Renfrewshire South, the seat of shadow Foreign Secretary Douglas Alexander. In both cases, swings of over 25% to the SNP were recorded. In the 2019 general election, Labour lost many formerly safe seats that were part of its 'Red Wall' in northern England. These defeats represented about 20% of the party's overall 2017 vote in such seats.

United States
Many American commentators have decried the tendency of most House seats to become safe seats, decreasing the number of contested seats in every cycle. This is due to a variety of disparate factors. The first involves migration patterns in the United States. Works by the Pew Research Center and author Bill Bishop show how like-minded voters will gravitate toward communities with shared values. Cities such as Berkeley, California, and Ogden, Utah, consistently elect members of one party due to their populations. The second factor revolves around partisan gerrymandering. Many congressional districts are gerrymandered – drawn by state legislatures to be all but unwinnable for the district's minority party (with only a handful of districts, either in strong pockets of support or in order to avoid court challenges of racial discrimination, allocated to the minority party), or with districts split through bipartisan agreements to ensure incumbent protection (such as maintaining heavily Democratic urban districts and heavily Republican rural districts). Specific U.S. States, congressional districts, and senate seats since 2000 are sometimes referred to as "solid blue" (Democratic Party) or "solid red" (Republican Party) after the use of these colors in television maps on election night.

The Cook Partisan Voting Index rates congressional districts on how strongly they lean towards either major party. As of the 2022 redistricting, California's 12th district is the most Democratic at D+40, while Alabama's 4th district is the most Republican at R+33.

Other examples of a safe seat for the Democrats is California's 12th congressional district, which currently covers most of the city of San Francisco. This district and its predecessors have been in Democratic hands without interruption since 1949. Its current representative, former House Speaker Nancy Pelosi, was most recently reelected with 77.6 percent of the vote.

Safe Republican seats include Tennessee's 1st congressional district and Tennessee's 2nd congressional district, which are located in the eastern part of the state. Both districts have been held by Republicans or their predecessors (except for two terms in the 1st) since 1859, despite the South's shift from being monolithically Democratic to being heavily Republican.

Because American representatives are generally residents of the constituency which they represent, it is much less common for aspiring politicians to select safe seats to represent. In fact, an aspiring politician may instead want to prove oneself by winning a swing seat and thus show they have the capability of winning a close-fought election, thus making the candidate more attractive for a state or national candidacy where those skills will be of greater importance. A candidate elected to a safe seat, on the other hand, can take greater risks in appealing to the base of the political party and totally disregard the minuscule opposition, thus leaving the candidate vulnerable to opposition attacks if they seek higher office; such a politician also does not have to focus as much on fundraising or networking, which further puts the candidate at a disadvantage in broader elections.

See also
 Gerrymandering
 Rotten and pocket boroughs, corrupt types of safe seat in the United Kingdom prior to the Reform Act 1832

References

Elections
Political terminology